Ndao is one of the southernmost islands of the Indonesian archipelago.

Administratively, Ndao forms, together with Rote and neighboring islands, the Rote Ndao Regency after the regency was separated from Kupang province.

Tourism 
Ndao has some areas that are popular for surfing.

References 

Lesser Sunda Islands
Rote Ndao Regency
Landforms of East Nusa Tenggara
Outer Banda Arc